Overspray refers to the application of any form of paint, varnish, stain or other non-water-soluble airborne particulate material onto an unintended location. This concept is most commonly encountered in graffiti, auto detailing, and when commercial paint jobs drift onto unintended objects.

Auto detailing and drifting paint
Overspray is considered a negative occurrence in auto detailing when unwanted drifting paint gets on cars. There are companies that are solely dealing with overspray and offering additional protection to cars while painting. Many of them includes producers of special solvents, razor blades and rubbing compounds. The most common procedure to remove overspray is the use of a special clay bar. There are many manufacturers of such bars, including: Meguiars, 3M, Clay magic, Mothers. Estimated 200,000 cars get oversprayed per year in the United States alone.

Overspray prevention
Various measures are employed to prevent overspray from damaging property and emitting airborne toxins: applying paint with rollers versus spray painting, dry fall coating, containment systems  and the implementation of wind monitoring programs by painting contractors.

References

Painting techniques